The 2015 College Nationals was the 20th Men's College Nationals.  The College Nationals was a team handball tournament to determined the College National Champion from 2015 from the US.

Venues
The championship was played at two venues at the Auburn University in Auburn, Alabama.

Draw

The draw for the men's was held on 26 March 2015 at 11:00 in Auburn. The seedings were based on the last College Nationals. As originator, Auburn was allowed to choose the group.

Seeding

Modus
The 12 teams were split into four groups. The seeding were based on the last College Nationals.

In the Group stage every group had a round-robin. The best two teams per group were qualified for the quarterfinals.

The four last teams from the group stage played a 9th - 12th place bracket.

The losers from the quarterfinals played a 5th - 8th place bracket.

The winners from the quarterfinals were qualified for the semifinals.

The losers from the semis played a small final and the winners the final.

Results
Source:

Group stage

Group A

Group B

Group C

Group D

Championship

Quarterfinals

Semifinals

Small Final

Final

Placement Games

5th–8th place bracket

5th–8th Semifinals

7th place game

5th place game

9th–12th place bracket

9th–12th Semifinals

11th place game

9th place game

All-Star game

Final ranking
Source:

Awards
Source:

Top scorers

Source:
When there is a tie by the goals the player with the better average was ranked first. When there was the same average the players have the same rank.

All-Star Team
Source:

References

External links
 Tournament Results archived

USA Team Handball College Nationals by year
Auburn Tigers